Guatuso is a canton in the Alajuela province of Costa Rica.

Toponymy
It is named for the region's original inhabitants, an indigenous tribe whose survivors are now known as the Maleku and remain as residents of the area.

History 
Guatuso was created on 17 March 1970 by decree 4541.

Geography 
Guatuso has an area of  km² and a mean elevation of  metres.

It is a diamond-shaped canton, with the Purgatorio River and the Frío River as the northeast border, the Cucaracha River as a portion of the southeast border, the Cordillera de Guanacaste on the southwest border, and the Rito River and the Mónico River on the northwest. Tenorio Volcano marks the far western point of the canton.

Districts 
The canton of Guatuso is subdivided into the following districts:
 San Rafael
 Buenavista
 Cote
 Katira

Demographics 

For the 2011 census, Guatuso had a population of  inhabitants.

Transportation

Road transportation 
The canton is covered by the following road routes:

References 

Cantons of Alajuela Province
Populated places in Alajuela Province